"Whenever You're Near Me" is the second single from Swedish group Ace of Base's third American record, Cruel Summer. The original version of the song, "Life Is a Flower", was a huge hit in Europe and Japan. The lyrics were rewritten by song composer Mike Chapman, and the song was released to radio stations in North and South America on October 6, 1998. This version peaked at number 76 in the United States and number 51 in Canada; it was the band's last charting hit in both countries.

Critical reception
Larry Flick from Billboard wrote that the song "shows Ace Of Base revisiting the more familiar pop/reggae sound that made the group a top 40 favorite." He noted that the track "builds upon a bankable sound rather than mimicking it. The song has a decidedly more complex arrangement, which is rife with sunny Caribbean percussion and a sweet smattering of acoustic guitar/synth interplay." He also added that Jenny's and Linn's vocals are "notably more restrained here than on past singles, which allows the melody and chorus to work their contagious magic without vocal overkill. Downright irresistible, this cute single should saturate airwaves within seconds." Gary Shipes from The Stuart News noted in his review, that "Whenever You're Near Me" and "Adventures in Paradise" are pristine pop productions worthy of ABBA and Trevor Horn's '80s confections for Buggles, Dollar and Frankie Goes to Hollywood."

Track listing
CD singles
Whenever You're Near Me
He Decides (Fisher Version aka American Album Version)

CD Maxi
Whenever You're Near Me (Album Version)
Whenever You're Near Me (Strobe's Radio Mix)
Whenever You're Near Me (Strobe's Lollipop Mix)
Whenever You're Near Me (Nikolas & Sibley Dance Radio Edit)
Whenever You're Near Me (Nikolas & Sibley Dance Mix)
Whenever You're Near Me (Strobe's Subway Mix)

Official versions/remixes
Album Version
Giuseppe D.'s Radio Remix
Giuseppe D.'s Radio Remix Instrumental
Giuseppe D.'s Extended Remix
Giuseppe D.'s Extended Remix Instrumental
Nikolas & Sibley Dance Mix
Nikolas & Sibley Dance Radio Edit
Strobe's Radio Remix
Strobe's Subway Mix
Strobe's Lollipop Mix
Strobe's Lollipop Mix Instrumental

Charts

References

Ace of Base songs
1998 singles
Songs written by Mike Chapman
1998 songs
Arista Records singles
Songs written by Jonas Berggren